The Australian cricket team toured India from 29 September to 20 October 2007. Seven ODIs from 29 September to 17 October were played. The series also included a Twenty20 International match played on 20 October, at Mumbai. Australia won the ODI series 4–2, India won the T20I match.

Squads

ODI series

1st ODI

2nd ODI

3rd ODI

4th ODI

5th ODI

6th ODI

7th ODI

Murali Karthik took 6 wickets to blow Australia away for just 193, after they got to a good start. India faltered at the start of their reply and fell to 64/6. Robin Uthappa scored 47 but was dismissed LBW to Michael Clarke. In the end, Zaheer Khan and Murali Karthik held their nerves to guide India to victory.

Only T20

See also
 Australian cricket team in 2007–08

References

External links
 Series home at ESPN Cricinfo
 Cricket blogs

2007 in Australian cricket
2007 in Indian cricket
India
2007
International cricket competitions in 2007